Ernie Sings & Glen Picks is an album by singer Tennessee Ernie Ford and singer/guitarist Glen Campbell, released in 1975.

Track listing

Side 1:

 "Trouble in Mind" (Richard M. Jones) – 3:02
 "(I'd Be) A Legend in My Time" (Don Gibson) – 2:31
 "Here Comes My Baby Back Again" (Dottie West, Bill West) – 2:52
 "There Goes My Everything" (Dallas Frazier) – 2:55
 "She Called Me Baby" (Harlan Howard) – 3:03

Side 2:

 "Gotta Get My Baby Back" (Floyd Tillman) – 3:40
 "Nobody Wins" (Kris Kristofferson) – 2:52
 "Loving Her Was Easier" (Kris Kristofferson) – 3:02
 "I Really Don't Want to Know" (Music – Don Robertson; Lyrics – Howard Barnes) – 2:48
 "For the Good Times" (Kris Kristofferson) – 3:38

Personnel
Ernie Ford – lead vocals
Glen Campbell – acoustic guitars, harmony vocals
Chuck Domanico – bass fiddle

Production
Producer – Steve Stone
Engineer – Hugh Davis
Photography – Rick Rankin

References

Ernie Sing and Glen Picks
Ernie Sing and Glen Picks
Ernie Sing and Glen Picks
Tennessee Ernie Ford albums
Albums recorded at Capitol Studios
Collaborative albums